The Okhla NSIC metro station is located on the Magenta Line of the Delhi Metro. The station was opened on 25 December 2017.

The station

Structure
Okhla NSIC elevated metro station situated on the Magenta Line of Delhi Metro.

Station layout

Facilities
List of available ATM at Okhla NSIC metro station are,

Entry/Exit

Connections

Bus
Delhi Transport Corporation bus routes number 47A, 306, 411, 427, 433A, 433LnkSTL, 463, 480, 493, 534A, OMS(+)(-), OMS(+)AC serves the station.

Rail
Okhla railway station of Indian Railways situated nearby.

See also

Delhi
List of Delhi Metro stations
Transport in Delhi
Delhi Metro Rail Corporation
Delhi Suburban Railway
Delhi Monorail
Delhi Transport Corporation
South East Delhi
Jamia Millia Islamia
Okhla Sanctuary
Okhla railway station
National Capital Region (India)
List of rapid transit systems
List of metro systems

References

External links

 Delhi Metro Rail Corporation Ltd. (Official site)
 Delhi Metro Annual Reports
 
 UrbanRail.Net – descriptions of all metro systems in the world, each with a schematic map showing all stations.

Delhi Metro stations
Railway stations in India opened in 2017
Railway stations in South East Delhi district